The American Society of Mechanical Engineers (ASME) is an American  professional association that, in its own words, "promotes the art, science, and practice of multidisciplinary engineering and allied sciences around the globe" via "continuing education, training and professional development, codes and standards, research, conferences and publications, government relations, and other forms of outreach."  ASME is thus an engineering society, a standards organization, a research and development organization, an advocacy organization, a provider of training and education, and a nonprofit organization. Founded as an engineering society focused on mechanical engineering in North America, ASME is today multidisciplinary and global.

ASME has over 85,000 members in more than 135 countries worldwide.

ASME was founded in 1880 by Alexander Lyman Holley, Henry Rossiter Worthington, John Edison Sweet and Matthias N. Forney in response to numerous steam boiler pressure vessel failures. Known for setting codes and standards for mechanical devices, ASME conducts one of the world's largest technical publishing operations, holds numerous technical conferences and hundreds of professional development courses each year and sponsors numerous outreach and educational programs. Georgia Tech president and women engineer supporter Blake R Van Leer was an executive member. Kate Gleason and Lydia Weld were the first two women members.

ASME codes and standards 

ASME is one of the oldest standards-developing organizations in America. It produces approximately 600 codes and standards covering many technical areas, such as fasteners, plumbing fixtures, elevators, pipelines, and power plant systems and components.  ASME's standards are developed by committees of subject matter experts using an open, consensus-based process.  Many ASME standards are cited by government agencies as tools to meet their regulatory objectives.  ASME standards are therefore voluntary, unless the standards have been incorporated into a legally binding business contract or incorporated into regulations enforced by an authority having jurisdiction, such as a federal, state, or local government agency.  ASME's standards are used in more than 100 countries and have been translated into numerous languages.

ASME boiler and pressure vessel code (BPVC)

The largest ASME standard, both in size and in the number of volunteers involved in its preparation, is the ASME Boiler and Pressure Vessel Code (BPVC). The BPVC provides rules for the design, fabrication, installation, inspection, care, and use of boilers, pressure vessels, and nuclear components. The code also includes standards on materials, welding and brazing procedures and qualifications, nondestructive examination, and nuclear in-service inspection.

Other notable standardization areas

Other Notable Standardization Areas include but not limited to are; Elevators and Escalators (A17 Series), Overhead and Mobile Cranes and related lifting and rigging equipment (B30 Series), Piping and Pipelines (B31 Series), Bio-processing Equipment (BPE), Valves Flanges, Fittings and Gaskets (B16), Nuclear Components and Processes Performance Test Codes.

Society awards
ASME offers four categories of awards: achievement awards to recognize "eminently distinguished engineering achievement"; literature awards for original papers; service awards for voluntary service to ASME; and unit awards, jointly awarded by six societies in recognition of advancement in the field of transportation. 

 ASME Medal
 Worcester Reed Warner Medal
 Charles T. Main Student Leadership Award
 Holley Medal
 Honorary Member
 Kate Gleason Award
 Henry Laurence Gantt Medal
 Leonardo Da Vinci Award
 Lewis F. Moody Award
 Melville Medal
 Old Guard Early Career Award
 Sia Nemat-Nasser Early Career Award
 Ralph Coats Roe Medal
 Soichiro Honda Medal

ASME Fellows 

ASME Fellow is a Membership Grade of Distinction conferred by The ASME Committee of Past Presidents to an ASME member with significant publications or innovations and distinguished scientific and engineering background. Over 3,000 members have attained the grade of Fellow. The ASME Fellow membership grade is the highest elected grade in ASME.

ASME E-Fests

ASME runs several annual E-Fests, or Engineering Festivals, taking the place of the Student Professional Development Conference (SPDC) series. In addition to the Human Powered Vehicle Challenge (HPVC), the Innovative Additive Manufacturing 3D Challenge (IAM3D), the Student Design Competition, and the Old Guard Competition, there are also talks, interactive workshops, and entertainment. These events allows students to network with working engineers, host contests, and promote ASME's benefits to students as well as professionals. E-Fests are held in four regions in the United States and internationally—western U.S, eastern U.S., Asia Pacific, and South America—with the E-Fest location for each region changing every year.

Student competitions

ASME holds a variety of competitions every year for engineering students from around the world.

 Human Powered Vehicle Challenge (HPVC)
 Student Design Competition (SDC)
 Innovative Design Simulation Challenge (IDSC)
 Innovative Additive Manufacturing 3D Challenge (IAM3D)
 Old Guard Competitions
 Innovation Showcase (IShow)
 Student Design Expositions

Organization 

ASME has four key offices in the United States, including its headquarters operation in New York, N.Y., and three international offices in Beijing, China; Brussels, Belgium, and New Delhi, India.  ASME has two institutes and 32 technical divisions within its organizational structure.  Volunteer activity is organized into four sectors: Technical Events and Content, Public Affairs and Outreach, Standards and Certification, and Student and Early Career Development.

Controversy
In 1982, ASME was found to be the first non-profit organization to in violation of the Sherman Antitrust Act.  The United States Supreme Court found the organization liable for more than $6 million in American Society of Mechanical Engineers v. Hydrolevel Corp.

See also 
 ASME Y14.41-2003 Digital Product Definition Data Practices
 List of American Society of Mechanical Engineers academic journals
 List of Historic Mechanical Engineering Landmarks
 ASME Medal
 ASME Boiler and Pressure Vessel Code
 Uniform Mechanical Code
 American Welding Society

References

Further reading
 Calvert, Monte A.  The Mechanical Engineer in America, 1830–1910: Professional Cultures in Conflict.  Baltimore: The Johns Hopkins University Press, 1967.
 Hutton, Frederick Remson (1915) A History of the American Society of Mechanical Engineers. ASME.
 Sinclair, Bruce.  A Centennial History of the American Society of Mechanical Engineers, 1880–1980.  Toronto: Toronto University Press, 1980.

External links

 
 ASME Peerlink
 Society Awards

 
American engineering organizations
Mechanical engineering organizations
 ASME
Historic Mechanical Engineering Landmarks
Engineering societies based in the United States
Organizations established in 1880
1880 establishments in New York (state)